Leonard Eugene Sweeney (born July 5, 1943) is a former Democratic member of the Pennsylvania House of Representatives.

Sweeney was accused of filing false insurance claims, charged with fraud, convicted and sentenced to at least six months in jail and fined $3,000.  Since no Pennsylvania Representative may serve when convicted, he was asked to step down from the seat to which he was newly elected.  When he refused, the House voted 176–1 to remove him immediately.  Sweeney appealed the ruling and lost.

References

Democratic Party members of the Pennsylvania House of Representatives
1943 births
Living people
Politicians from Pittsburgh
Pennsylvania politicians convicted of crimes
People expelled from United States state legislatures